Popular Alliance may refer to:

Popular Alliance (San Marino), political party in San Marino
Popular Alliance (San Marino, historical), defunct political alliance in San Marino
Popular Alliance (Spain), predecessor of the current conservative party Partido Popular